The Molecular Conceptor Learning Series, produced by Synergix Ltd, is an interactive computer-based learning suite that teaches the principles and techniques used in everyday drug discovery. The Molecular Conceptor Learning Series comprises five modules each of which are designed to give students and professionals in the drug discovery field the comprehensive training necessary to face even the toughest drug design challenges. The modules are:
Medicinal chemistry
Drug design
Cheminformatics
Structural bioinformatics
Practical Drug Discovery: Case Studies.

The Molecular Conceptor Learning Series presents the fundamental topics surrounding computer-aided drug design from basic principles to more in-depth examination and using interactive 3D technology, practical examples and many case studies, the concepts, methodologies and techniques used in drug discovery are brought to life.

International experts in the field of drug discovery have shared their skills, knowledge and experiences, and allowed the Synergix Ltd team to create The Molecular Conceptor Learning Series, an el tool that provides both students and professionals of the life sciences sector with the day-to-day knowledge and skills required to make an impact on modern drug discovery.

The concept 

The concept behind the Molecular Conceptor Learning Series aims to bring together, in a ready-digested format, the necessary knowledge surrounding the skills, techniques and approaches used by the drug discovery team as a whole. It provides all the information needed by the medicinal chemist to allow him to analyze, understand and make informed decisions concerning the design of a drug, thus enabling them to contribute effectively to the drug discovery process.

Contents 

The full Molecular Conceptor Learning Series can be broken down into 10 main volumes, which are broken down into a number of chapters, each of which tackles a different aspect of drug design. The 10 volumes are as follows:
Drug Discovery
Analog Design and Molecular Mimicry
Synthesis and Library Design
Protein Structure and Modeling
Structure-Based Design
Cheminformatics
Ligand-Based Design
QSAR and Chemometrics
Molecular Basis of Drugs
Peptidomimetics
General Topics

Molecular Conceptor, Version 1, was first released in December 2001 with 600 pages.  Since then the software has developed and grown and in Oct 2010, Version 2.14 was released with more than 5000 pages.

References

External links 
 Molecular Conceptor Learning Series Website

Science education software
Molecular modelling software